The Church of Jesus Christ of Latter-day Saints in Sierra Leone refers to the Church of Jesus Christ of Latter-day Saints (LDS Church) and its members in Sierra Leone.  At year-end 2009, there were 8,054 members in 17 branches in Sierra Leone. In 2021, there were 26,108 members in 86 congregations. In 2019, Sierra Leone ranked as having the second most LDS Church members per capita in Africa, behind Cape Verde.

History

The first official meeting of the LDS Church in Sierra Leone was held in Goderich in January 1988, with the first LDS missionaries arriving in May of that year. They were under the Liberia Monrovia Mission. A district was organized in Freetown in 1990. At various times in the 1990s, missionaries were withdrawn due to the civil war in the country. In 1991, the Liberia Monrovia Mission was discontinued and Sierra Leone was placed under the Accra Ghana Mission.  The first LDS-built meetinghouse in the country was completed in Bo in 2004.  In 2007, the Sierra Leone Freetown Mission was created covering both Sierra Leone and Liberia. In December 2012, Jeffrey R. Holland created the first LDS stake in Sierra Leone in Freetown.  In 2013, Liberia was split off to be its own separate mission.

A brief history can be found at LDS Newsroom (Sierra Leone) or Deseret News 2010 Church Almanac (Country Information: Sierra Leone)

Stakes and districts
The Freetown Sierra Leone Stake was organized on December 2, 2012, making it the 3,000th stake in the LDS Church. As of February 2023, Sierra Leone had the following stakes and districts:

Stakes and Districts

Congregations in Sierra Leone not part of a stake or district include:
Kapeteh Branch
Koidu Branch
Moyamba Branch
Sierra Leone Freetown Mission Branch

The Sierra Leone Freetown Mission Branch serves families and individuals in Sierra Leone that is not in proximity of a meetinghouse.

Missions
 Sierra Leone Freetown

2014 West Africa Ebola outbreak
After two of its members died during the 2014 West Africa Ebola outbreak, the LDS Church required its missionaries to remain in their apartments as a precautionary measure.  Then on August 1, 2014 the LDS Church announced that it would transfer all of its 274 missionaries out of Sierra Leone and Liberia, thereby closing the Sierra Leone Freetown Mission for the duration of the outbreak.

Temples
On October 5, 2019, the Freetown Sierra Leone Temple was announced by church president Russell M. Nelson.

See also

 Religion in Sierra Leone

References

External links
 LDS Newsroom (Sierra Leone)
 The Church of Jesus Christ of Latter-day Saints - Official Site
 The Church of Jesus Christ of Latter-day Saints - Visitors Site

Churches in Sierra Leone
The Church of Jesus Christ of Latter-day Saints in Africa
1988 establishments in Sierra Leone